Kristoffer Aamot (26 March 1889 – 22 March 1955) was a Norwegian journalist, magazine editor, politician and cinema administrator. As a young journalist he was sentenced to one year imprisonment for his writings in the newspaper Klassekampen. He was a member of the Oslo City Council from 1917 to 1937. He was a director of Oslo Kinematografer from 1934 to 1955, except for the war years. A film award (in ) was named after him.

He was also the writer of the Norwegian comic strip Skomakker Bekk og Tvillingene Hans, which was drawn by Jan Lunde.

References

1889 births
1955 deaths
Writers from Oslo
20th-century Norwegian journalists
Norwegian magazine editors
Norwegian film directors
Norwegian comics writers
Local politicians in Norway
Politicians from Oslo
Imprisoned journalists